Luckow may refer to:

Luckow, Brandenburg
Luckow, Mecklenburg-Vorpommern